Chardri (late 12th–early 13th centuries) was an Anglo-Norman poet, probably from western England. His pen name is probably an anagram of Richard.

Three of his poems, all in rhyming octosyllabic couplets, have survived:

 presents a Christianized version of the life of Buddha, 2954 lines
 records the story of the Seven Sleepers of Ephesus, 1898 lines
, 1780 lines

His work is transmitted in manuscripts alongside The Owl and the Nightingale.

References

Anglo-Norman literature
13th-century English writers
13th-century French poets